Fayette County is a county located in the U.S. state of Illinois. As of the 2010 census, the population was 22,140. Its county seat is Vandalia, the site of the Vandalia State House State Historic Site.  Ramsey Lake State Recreation Area is located in the northwest part of this county.

History
Fayette County was formed in 1821 out of Bond, Clark, and Crawford counties. It was named in honor of the Marquis de LaFayette, French hero of the American Revolutionary War.

Geography

Climate and weather

Adjacent counties
 Shelby County - northeast
 Effingham County - east
 Clay County - southeast
 Marion County - south
 Clinton County - southwest
 Bond County - west
 Montgomery County - northwest

Major highways
  Interstate 57
  Interstate 70
  U.S. Route 40
  U.S. Route 51
  Illinois Route 33
  Illinois Route 37
  Illinois Route 128
  Illinois Route 140
  Illinois Route 185

Demographics

As of the 2010 United States Census, there were 22,140 people, 8,311 households, and 5,648 families living in the county. The racial makeup of the county was 93.7% white, 4.4% black or African American, 0.2% Asian, 0.2% American Indian, 0.4% from other races, and 1.0% from two or more races. Those of Hispanic or Latino origin made up 1.4% of the population. In terms of ancestry, 27.5% were German, 10.5% were English, 9.4% were American, and 9.3% were Irish.

Of the 8,311 households, 31.2% had children under the age of 18 living with them, 53.3% were married couples living together, 9.7% had a female householder with no husband present, 32.0% were non-families, and 27.2% of all households were made up of individuals. The average household size was 2.45 and the average family size was 2.95. The median age was 39.9 years.

The median income for a household in the county was $41,269 and the median income for a family was $51,216. Males had a median income of $38,257 versus $27,188 for females. The per capita income for the county was $21,663. About 10.8% of families and 16.1% of the population were below the poverty line, including 22.6% of those under age 18 and 12.0% of those age 65 or over.

Communities

Cities
 St. Elmo
 Vandalia (seat)

Villages
 Bingham
 Brownstown
 Farina
 Ramsey
 St. Peter

Unincorporated communities

 Augsburg
 Avena
 Bayle City
 Bluff City
 Confidence
 Dressor
 Hagarstown
 La Clede
 Loogootee
 Pittsburg
 Saint James
 Saint Paul
 Shafter
 Shobonier
 Vera

Townships
Fayette County is divided into twenty townships:

 Avena
 Bear Grove
 Bowling Green
 Carson
 Kaskaskia
 LaClede
 Lone Grove
 Loudon
 North Hurricane
 Otego
 Pope
 Ramsey
 Sefton
 Seminary
 Shafter
 Sharon
 South Hurricane
 Vandalia
 Wheatland
 Wilberton

Politics
Until the beginning of the twentieth century, Fayette County was rock-ribbed Democratic. It was not won by a Republican until Theodore Roosevelt’s landslide win of 1904. The county voted after that for the winning candidate in every election until 1940, when opposition to Franklin D. Roosevelt’s economic and war policies gave the county to Wendell Willkie. Since then only two Democratic presidential candidates have gained an absolute majority in the county – the more recent of these two, Jimmy Carter in 1976, doing so by a single vote.

See also
 National Register of Historic Places listings in Fayette County, Illinois

References
 United States Census Bureau 2007 TIGER/Line Shapefiles
 United States Board on Geographic Names (GNIS)
 United States National Atlas

 
Illinois counties
1821 establishments in Illinois
Populated places established in 1821